Sibyl Sanderson (December 7, 1864May 16, 1903) was a famous American operatic dramatic coloratura soprano during the Parisian Belle Époque.

Biography
She was born in Sacramento, California, in the United States.  Sibyl's father Silas Sanderson was a California politician and lawyer; after serving as Chief Justice of the Supreme Court of California, he became a highly paid legal advisor to the Southern Pacific Railroad. After his death in 1886, she and her mother and sisters moved back to Paris and became transplanted socialites.  Sanderson proved to be a remarkably gifted singer and began to appear on the stages of the Opéra-Comique, and later Opéra, in Paris, most notably in the works of Jules Massenet.  She was his favorite soprano and appeared in the premieres of a number of his operas, the roles having been created for her unique talents (her professional debut took place in Paris in the title role in Esclarmonde).  She was also a famous interpreter of Manon, Massenet's most enduring opera.

Sanderson was also admired by Camille Saint-Saëns, who wrote the title role in Phryné for her.  Success outside of Paris was elusive for Sanderson; she appeared at Covent Garden and the Metropolitan Opera (debut in title role of Manon on January 16, 1895, the last performance as Juliette in Roméo et Juliette on December 31, 1901) to lackluster reviews.

In 1897 she married a Cuban millionaire and sugar heir Antonio E. Terry (d. 1899), after which she temporarily halted her operatic activity, making an unsuccessful comeback two years later.

Her last years were marred by depression, alcoholism and illness and she died in Paris of a malignant influenza (pneumonia), at the age of thirty-eight.  Sanderson was responsible for helping launch the career of another soprano made famous in the French repertoire, Mary Garden.

Roles created for Sanderson
The title role in Esclarmonde by Massenet, on May 14, 1889
The title role in Phryné by Saint-Saëns on May 24, 1893
The title role in Thaïs by Massenet on March 16, 1894

Further reading

References

External links
  – 1903 cremated remains buried in Paris
  – remans re-interred in Minneapolis

1865 births
1903 deaths
American operatic sopranos
19th-century American actresses
American stage actresses
Musicians from Sacramento, California
American expatriate actresses in France
Deaths from pneumonia in France
19th-century American women opera singers
Singers from California
Infectious disease deaths in France
Classical musicians from California
Belle Époque